Julia Marino may refer to:

 Julia Marino (snowboarder), slopestyle gold medal winner from the United States
 Julia Marino (skier), Olympic competitor for Paraguay